Lake Ellen may refer to:

Lake Ellen (Minnesota)
Lake Ellen (Wisconsin)

See also
Lake Ellen Kimberlite
Lake Ellen Wilson